Bradley Fred Adamonis (born January 16, 1973) is an American professional golfer who has played on the PGA Tour.

Adamonis' grandparents are of Lithuanian descent. He was born in Providence, Rhode Island and graduated from Miami University in Oxford, Ohio in 1996 with a degree in Sports Management. While at Miami, he was first-team All-Mid-American Conference in his senior year. He also won the 1994 New England Invitational while at Miami. He turned professional after graduating.

Adamonis played on the Nationwide Tour from 2002 to 2004, 2006 and 2007 and the NGA Hooters Tour in 2003 and 2005. He earned his 2008 PGA Tour card by placing in the top 25 of qualifying school. He won his first professional tournament on the Nationwide Tour in 2007 at the WNB Golf Classic.

In his rookie season on the PGA Tour, Adamonis finished just high enough on the money list to retain his tour card for 2009. He finished in 124th with $862,413. He also recorded three top-10 finishes including a runner-up finish at the John Deere Classic. Adamonis went into a three-way playoff with Kenny Perry and Jay Williamson. Perry won the tournament on the first playoff hole.

Adamonis played in his first major at the 2011 U.S. Open. He missed a qualifying spot by one stroke, but was a first alternate. He was the 156th and final entry added to the event at Congressional Country Club. He did not make the cut.

Professional wins (1)

Nationwide Tour wins (1)

Nationwide Tour playoff record (1–0)

Playoff record
PGA Tour playoff record (0–1)

Results in major championships

CUT = missed the half-way cut
Note: Adamonis only played in the U.S. Open.

See also
2007 PGA Tour Qualifying School graduates

References

External links

American male golfers
Miami RedHawks men's golfers
PGA Tour golfers
Golfers from Rhode Island
Sportspeople from Providence, Rhode Island
People from Hallandale Beach, Florida
American people of Lithuanian descent
1973 births
Living people